Marsabit central (Saku Constituency) is an electoral constituency in Kenya. It is one of four constituencies in Marsabit County in Northern Kenya. It borders North Horr Constituency to the North and Laisamis Constituency to the South.  The constituency was established for the 1988 elections. Marsabit town which is the county headquarters is in Saku constituency.

Members of Parliament

Locations and wards

References

External links 
Map of the constituency

Constituencies of Marsabit County
Constituencies in Eastern Province (Kenya)
1988 establishments in Kenya
Constituencies established in 1988